Sanna 11–22 was released on March 7, 2007 and is the first greatest hits compilation album from Swedish singer Sanna Nielsen. It peaked at number 19 on the Swedish Albums Chart. The album title refers to the age she started recording songs to her present age.

Track listing 
Vågar du, vågar jag
Surrender
Loneliness
Nära mig
Rör vid min själ (You Raise Me Up)
Koppången
Du och jag mot världen (vocal duet: Sanna Nielsen-Fredrik Kempe)
Hela världen för mig
Där bor en sång
I går, i dag
Time to Say Goodbye
Till en ängel
En gång när jag blir stor
Änglafin

Reviews 
AllMusic critic John Lucas said, "Listening to this collection, one does get the impression that Nielsen has yet to really find a defining hit of her own, enjoyable as many of the cuts are. Still, with 11 years of success behind her and still just 22-years-old, she has plenty of time to discover a song that's as good as her voice is. If that ever happens, volume two of this collection could be even better".

Charts

References

External links 
 "Sanna 11-22" at the Swedish album chart

2007 compilation albums
Sanna Nielsen albums
Compilation albums by Swedish artists
Swedish-language compilation albums